The 1983 Bandy World Championship was the 13th Bandy World Championship and was played in Finland. The Swedish national team became champions for the second time. Only four countries participated, but this was the last world championship played with so few contestants.

Squads

Series
 15 February
 Sweden – USSR	1–2
 Finland – Norway 6–1
 16 February
 USSR – Norway	10–5
 Finland – Sweden 0–8
 18 February
 Finland – USSR 0–6
 Sweden – Norway 8–0

Match for 3rd place
19 February
Finland – Norway 4–1

Final
 20 February
Soviet Union – Sweden 3–9

References

1983
World Championship
Bandy World Championship
International bandy competitions hosted by Finland
Bandy World Championship